Mu Cassiopeiae, Latinized from μ Cassiopeiae, is a binary star system in the constellation Cassiopeia. This system shares the name Marfak  with Theta Cassiopeiae, and the name was from Al Marfik or Al Mirfaq (المرفق), meaning "the elbow". It is dimly visible to the naked eye as a point of light with an apparent visual magnitude of 5.16. The system is located at a distance of 24.6 light years from the Sun based on parallax, and is moving closer with a high radial velocity of −98 km/s. This star will move into the constellation Perseus around 5200 AD.

Mu Cassiopeiae is given as a standard star for the spectral class G5Vb, although it is frequently described as a subdwarf, meaning it has a luminosity below that expected for a G5 main sequence star. The metallicity, or abundance of heavy elements, is about one-sixth that in the Sun. It is slightly smaller than the Sun with less mass and a lower luminosity.

This is one of the first high-velocity stars to be identified. Compared to other nearby stars including the Sun, this pair are moving at a relatively high velocity of 167 km/s through the Milky Way galaxy. They are low metal, Population II stars that are thought to have formed before the galactic disk first appeared.

Companions 
There are five visible companions to Mu Cassiopeiae listed in the Washington Double Star Catalog. All are distant background objects fainter than 11th magnitude. The brightest of these is catalogued as component B, but the very high proper motion of Mu Cassiopeiae has caused it to almost double its distance from B.  There are now two other stars brighter than magnitude 10 that are closer to Mu Cassiopeiae, although they are also background objects. Mu Cassiopeiae itself is known as an astrometric binary, a star that is observed to oscillate due to the gravitational influence of an unseen companion, and that companion has now been resolved.

In 1961, the close binary nature of this system was discovered by Nicholas E. Wagman at the Allegheny Observatory. Since then the orbital elements of the two stars have been fairly well established. The two stars are separated by a semimajor axis of 7.61 AUs with distance range of 3.3-11.9 AUs. In 1966, the individual components were first resolved by the American astronomer Peter A. Wehinger using the 84-inch reflector at the Kitt Peak National Observatory, allowing an initial estimate of separate masses.  The companion is over six magnitudes (330 times) fainter than the primary star, and it is presumed to be a red dwarf, a class M main sequence or subdwarf star.

References

External links
 
 SolStation entry

G-type main-sequence stars
G-type subdwarfs
M-type main-sequence stars
Cassiopeiae, Mu
Binary stars

Cassiopeia (constellation)
Cassiopeiae, Mu
Durchmusterung objects
Cassiopeiae, 30
006582
0053
005336
0321